Wesley Martin Knapp is a regional botanist with the North Carolina Natural Heritage Program. Originally from New Hampshire, Knapp is an expert in North American plants belonging to the Cyperaceae (sedges) and Juncaceae (rushes). Knapp has published research in journals including: Systematic Botany, the Botanical Research Institute of Texas , Evansia, and Opuscula Philolicheum.

Papers published
Systematic Botany - Knapp, W.M. & R.F.C. Naczi 2008. Taxonomy, Morphology, and Geographic Distribution of Juncus longii (Juncaceae) Systematic Botany 33(4): 685-694
Opuscula Philolichenum - Lendemer, J.C. & W.M. Knapp. 2007. Contributions to the Lichen Flora of Maryland: Recent Collections from the Delmarva Peninsula.
Botanical Research Institute of Texas (Formerly SIDA) - Knapp, W.M. & D. Estes. 2006. Gratiola brevifolia (Plantaginaceae) New to the Flora of Delaware, the Delmarva Peninsula and the Mid-Atlantic. SIDA 22(1):825-829.

References

External links
 http://www.nybg.org/files/scientists/rnaczi//Juncuslongii/Knapp%20&%20Naczi%20Sys%20Bot%20J%20longii.pdf
 http://sweetgum.nybg.org/webmedia.php?irn=248688
 http://www.andestoamazon.com/Sida/PDF/PDF22(1)/57_Knapp-Estes_Gratiola_825-829.pdf

21st-century American botanists
Botanists active in North America
Living people
Year of birth missing (living people)